The Greenwich Village Crew is a crew within the Genovese crime family, active in the Greenwich Village area of Manhattan. It was originally controlled by Don Vito Genovese from the early 1920s until his arrest in the late 1950s. In the early 1980s capo Vincent Gigante, was made the new boss of the Genovese crime family. He continued to operate from and with the Greenwich Village Crew members. Today the crew is still active, but after the death of Dominick Canterino, it is uncertain who is controlling the crew.

Locations and activities
The crew controlled many of the organized crime activities throughout downtown Manhattan, and some of the rackets included labor racketeering, gambling, loan sharking, hijackings, and extortion of businesses. The main hangout for Gigante and his crew was the Triangle Social Club, located at 208 Sullivan Street.

Historical leadership

Caporegimes
1920s-1931 — Vito Genovese – promoted to underboss 1931; promoted to boss in 1957
1931-1959 — Anthony "Tony Bender" Strollo – promoted to acting boss in 1959; killed 1962
1959-1965 — Thomas "Tommy Ryan" Eboli – promoted to front boss 1965-1972; killed in 1972
1965-1972 — Pasquale "Patsy Ryan" Eboli – younger brother to Thomas Eboli
Acting 1965-1972 — Dominick "Dom The Sailor" DiQuarto
1972-1981 — Vincent "The Chin" Gigante – promoted to boss in 1981
Acting 1978-1981 — Dominick "Fat Dom" Alongi – retired to Florida
1981-1993 — Dominick "Baldy Dom" Canterino – retired, died in 2008 
1993–present – Unknown – since the retirement of Dominick Canterino it is unknown who took over this crew.

Former and current members
 Mario Gigante
 Dominick Cirillo
 Frank Condo
 Venero Mangano
 Louis Manna
 Andrew Gigante
 Vincent Esposito
 Ronald Belliveau
 Frank Caggiano
 Giuseppe Dellacroe
 Joseph Denti
 Ciro Perrotta

References

Organizations established in the 1920s
1920s establishments in New York City
Genovese crime family
American Mafia crews
Gangs in New York City
Greenwich Village